The 2002 IRL Infiniti Pro Series was the series' first season. The IPS served as a new developmental series to the Indy Racing League. All drivers utilized Dallara chassis and Infiniti engines. A. J. Foyt IV was the series champion.

Team and driver chart

Schedule

Race results

Championship standings

Drivers' Championship

Scoring system

 The driver who qualifies on pole is awarded one additional point.
 An additional point is awarded to the driver who leads the most laps in a race.

Complete Overview

R9=retired, but classified NS15=did not start, but classified

References

Indy Lights seasons
Infiniti Pro Series
Infiniti Pro